Zinc finger protein 469 is a protein that in humans is encoded by the ZNF469 gene.

Function

This gene encodes a zinc-finger protein. Low-percent homology to certain collagens suggests that it may function as a transcription factor or extra-nuclear regulator factor for the synthesis or organization of collagen fibers. Mutations in this gene cause brittle cornea syndrome.

Clinical significance 

Mutations in ZNF469 are associated to keratoconus. as well as a type of Ehlers-Danlos syndrome called brittle cornea syndrome.

References

Further reading